Al-Bira, is a depopulated former Palestinian village located
7.5 km north of Baysan. During Operation Gideon, the village was occupied by the Golani Brigade.

History
It has been suggested that the village was the site mentioned in the records of Tutmose III´s military campaign in Palestine in 1468 BC.

Ottoman era
In the 1596 tax records, al-Bira was a village in the Ottoman Empire, nahiya (subdistrict) of Shafa under the liwa' (district) of Lajjun, with a population of 54 Muslim households; an estimated 297 persons.  They paid a fixed tax rate of 25%  on a number of crops, including wheat, barley, and olives, as well as on goats and beehives;  a total of 12,000  akçe.

Al-Bira appeared as a village in a map published in 1850, but was found uninhabited later in the 19th century.  Guérin reported that "The ruins are those of a large Arab village, whose houses were built for the most part of basaltic stones. It replaced an ancient township, to which belongs an edifice now completely destroyed, of which there yet remain several basaltic columns and a mutilated capital."

British Mandate era
In the 1922 census of Palestine, conducted in Mandatory Palestine authorities,  Al-Bira had a population of 200 Muslims, increasing in the  1931 census   to 220, still all Muslims, in 53  houses.

In the 1945 statistics, the population consisted of 260 Muslims, with a total of 6,866 dunams of land.   Of this, 48 dunams were for plantations or irrigable land, 4,667 for cereals, while 53 were built-up (urban) land.

1948, aftermath
The village became depopulated on 16 May 1948.

According to Benny Morris, kibbutzniks demanded the destruction of neighboring villages as a means of blocking the return of the Arab villagers. For this reason a veteran local leader, Nahum Hurwitz of Kfar Gil'adi appealed in a letter  in September 1948 for permission to destroy al-Bira, Kawkab al-Hawa, Jabbul,  and al-Hamidiyya in the area for fear that they may be used by Arabs for military operations and to enable them to "take the village's lands, because the Arabs won't be able to return there".

According to the Palestinian historian Walid Khalidi, in 1992: 
"The only remains of the village are the walls of houses. The fenced in site is covered with weeds, cactuses, and thorns, Fig and mulberry trees grow near a spring in the valley at the bottom of the site. The surrounding land are used for grazing."

References

Bibliography

External links
Welcome to al-Bira
al-Bira, Zochrot
Survey of Western Palestine, map 9:   IAA, Wikimedia commons
Al-Bira from the Khalil Sakakini Cultural Center

Arab villages depopulated during the 1948 Arab–Israeli War
District of Baysan